KBTA (1340 AM) is a radio station broadcasting a Sports format. Licensed to Batesville, Arkansas, United States, the station is currently owned by White River Now/WRD Entertainment and features programming from CBS Sports Radio as well as local sports-talk programming.

References

External links

BTA
Sports radio stations in the United States
Radio stations established in 1950
1950 establishments in Arkansas
CBS Sports Radio stations